Contalmaison is a commune in the Somme department in Hauts-de-France in northern France.

Geography

History
As with many towns in this part of France, Contalmaison saw a great deal of fighting during World War I and was one of the allied objectives in the first Battle of the Somme.

A high number of casualties fell on the first day: 1 July 1916. The advance from the British line in front of Albert, was led by the 34th Division, a New Army formation recruited in Edinburgh, Northumberland, Grimsby and Cambridge. Elements of the 16th Royal Scots ('McCrae's Battalion') and of Tyneside Irish battalions of the Northumberland Fusiliers succeeded in penetrating the village defences on 1 July before being outnumbered and forced to withdraw by stubborn German opposition.

The village is notable for its McCrae's Battalion Great War Memorial which honours the fallen of the 16th Royal Scots. Designed by the historian Jack Alexander, the 'Contalmaison Cairn' was unveiled in November 2004, completing a project first proposed by veterans of the battalion in 1919. As such, it remains the last of the 'original' Great War memorials to be built.

Population

See also
Communes of the Somme department

References

Communes of Somme (department)